This is a list of animated television series first aired in 2016.

See also 
 List of Japanese animation television series of 2016
 2016 in animation

Notes

References

2016
2016
Television series
2016-related lists